The Way of the World: A Story of Truth and Hope in an Age of Extremism is a 2008 non-fiction book by Ron Suskind, claiming various actions and policies of the George W. Bush administration. Most notably, it alleges that the Bush administration ordered the forgery of the Habbush letter to implicate Iraq as having ties to al Qaeda and the hijackers in the September 11 attacks. All these claims have been strenuously denied by the White House and all parties involved. The book, published on August 5, 2008, by Harper, met mixed reviews but received considerable media attention and created controversy.

Contents

In the book, Suskind details and describes a variety of actions, policies, and procedures of the Bush administration. The most widely publicized allegation in the book is that high-ranking White House officials ordered the Central Intelligence Agency (CIA) to forge or manufacture a justification for the Iraq War through a backdated, handwritten document—namely, the Habbush letter—linking Saddam Hussein and al-Qaeda. The letter purported to be from General Tahir Jalil Habbush al-Tikriti, the head of Iraqi Intelligence, to Saddam Hussein, detailing training which 9/11 hijacker Mohamed Atta supposedly received in Iraq and mentioning receipt of a shipment from Niger. Suskind says that the CIA forged this letter before the 2003 Iraq invasion, on an order from the White House. The author also claims that the Bush administration had information from a top Iraqi Intelligence official, General Tahir Jalil Habbush al-Tikriti, "that there were no weapons of mass destruction in Iraq—intelligence they received in plenty of time to stop an invasion". Suskind further states that Vice-President Dick Cheney implemented a set of procedures and processes designed to make the President less involved and less accountable for various controversial decisions and actions.

Reception
The book received considerable media attention. Suskind was twice interviewed on the week of the book's release by Meredith Vieira, on NBC's Today show. He was interviewed on NPR's Fresh Air by Dave Davies, as well as on The Daily Show with Jon Stewart on August 11. On August 12, Suskind appeared live online at The Washington Post'''s "Book World Live". On August 13 and 14, he appeared on Democracy Now!,"After Ron Suskind Reveals Bush Admin Ordered Iraq-9/11 Fakery, House Judiciary Chair John Conyers Opens Congressional Probe". Democracy Now! August 14, 2008. and on August 15, he appeared on Hannity & Colmes.

CIA statement
On August 22, 2008, the CIA released a statement on its website regarding the allegations in Suskind's book:

When asked why the CIA had made an exception to its general practice of not commenting on books, a spokesman wrote that it was because "the allegations were so egregious—including the suggestion that the agency broke the law—that we felt a response was both necessary and appropriate".

Tenet followed the CIA release with a new statement of his own saying that it was "ridiculous to think that the White House would give me such and order and even more ridiculous to think that I would carry it out". He added that as the head of the CIA he had "consistently fought with some Administration officials to prevent them from overstating the case for Iraqi involvement in international terrorism".

The Washington Post reports that "Suskind, whose claims are now the subject of two congressional investigations, yesterday continued to stand by his book and accused the CIA and White House of orchestrating a smear campaign. 'It's the same old stuff,' said Suskind, who said his findings are supported by hours of interviews, some of them taped. 'There's not a shred of doubt about any of it.'"

Controversies

Habbush forgery
 
One of the most controversial claims in the book is that the White House directed the CIA to forge a letter from an Iraqi intelligence official. This claim rests on Suskind's interviews with multiple sources, including three former intelligence officials who spoke on the record: Robert Richer and John Maguire from the CIA and Nigel Inkster from the British foreign intelligence service, MI6.

All three men have issued public statements responding to the controversy. Robert Richer, the CIA's former deputy director of clandestine operations, said: "I never received direction from George Tenet or anyone else in my chain of command to fabricate a document ... as outlined in Mr. Suskind's book." Richer also says that he reviewed the book before it was published, and told Suskind he had got it wrong. Richer stated that he was considering legal action against Suskind.

John Maguire, who headed the CIA's Iraq Operations Group, issued a statement through Richer saying: "I never received any instruction from then Chief/NE Rob Richer or any other officer in my chain of command instructing me to fabricate such a letter." Nigel Inkster called Suskind's allegations "inaccurate and misleading", saying: "Mr Suskind's characterisation of our meeting is more the stuff of creative fiction than serious reportage, and seeks to make more of it than the circumstances or the content warranted."

The White House also denied the allegation. Deputy press secretary, Tony Fratto, said: "The notion that the White House directed anyone to forge a letter from Habbush to Saddam Hussein is absurd." George Tenet, the former Director of Central Intelligence, said that "there was no such order from the White House to me nor, to the best of my knowledge, was anyone from CIA ever involved in any such effort", adding: "The notion that I would suddenly reverse our stance and have created and planted false evidence that was contrary to our own beliefs is ridiculous."

Suskind's response to his critics
Suskind responded in an interview to Richer's statement, saying: "You know, that’s a very narrow legalistic response of—lawyers in Washington have called, saying that’s actually a non-denial denial, because, in terms of chain of command, Rob Richer is not actually on George’s chain of command, if you will. It goes around to Rob Richer."

After Suskind posted his partial transcript, Richer issued a second statement, saying: "Mr. Suskind has now released an edited transcript of an apparent conversation between us that he alleges supports one of the central themes in his book. It does not.I stand by my earlier statement and my absolute belief that the charges outlined in Mr. Suskind's book regarding Agency involvement in forging documents are not true."Stein, Jeff (August 13, 2008).. Spy Talk. Archived from the original  on August 17, 2008. Suskind has also claimed that Richer came under pressure to release his statement; on an interview with National Public Radio, he stated:

Regarding Maguire's statement, Suskind noted:

In another interview with Democracy Now!, Suskind claims that he confirmed the claims of Richer and Maguire in several interviews: "The fact is, is it’s not a matter of a passing conversation. We had many conversations on this specific issue, on the Habbush matter, with all of the key sources. There was never any mystery about what it was, what the Habbush letter was, what the Habbush mission entailed, in terms of the setup with the Iraq intelligence chief. I mean, exhaustive, hour after hour. And the way I do it as an investigative reporter, is you go back again and again and again." And in the NPR interview, he claims that both Richer and Maguire had indicated a willingness to testify against the administration about these allegations: "both of them, frankly, are big believers in the truth process. And I've talked to both of them about, 'Hey, you're never going to feel heat quite like this.' And they said, both of them, Richer and Maguire, 'I'm ready to go in front of Senate committees and House committees. I'm ready to have my moment.' They knew everything that was in the book. You know, once they get there and the moment arrives, sometimes their knees buckle. And then you kind of say, 'All right, let's take a deep breath.' And you get them upright, and they tend to often then walk forward."

Responding to Tenet, Suskind admitted that he had not spoken to Tenet about the allegation.

Suskind responded to the White House's claim that he "has chosen to dwell in the netherworld of bizarre conspiracy theories" by stating that they were "all but obligated to deny this".

Dan Froomkin of The Washington Post elaborated: "The allegation in Ron Suskind's new book that the White House ordered the CIA to forge evidence of a link between Iraq and al Qaeda is so incredibly grave that it demands a serious response from the government. If what Suskind writes is true – or even partially true – someone at the highest levels of the White House engaged in a criminal conspiracy to deceive the American public ... But so far, we've gotten mostly hyperbole, innuendo and narrowly constructed denials." He goes on:

Congressional investigation
The House Judiciary Committee announced plans to investigate the allegations. Committee Chairman John Conyers has called it "the most critical investigation of the entire Bush administration".

Conyers' office issued letters directing some of the principals allegedly involved in the forgery to appear before the committee for questioning. These included Rob Richer, Assistant to the Vice President for National Security Affairs John P. Hannah, and former chief of staff to the Vice President Lewis I. "Scooter" Libby, who was convicted of perjury and obstruction of justice for his involvement in the Valerie Plame scandal, as well as George Tenet, John Maguire, and A.B. "Buzzy" Krongard (the number three-man at the CIA, who Suskind says also confirmed the allegations).

WMD distortions
Another controversial claim in the book is that former Iraqi Intelligence Chief Habbush had told American and British intelligence that there were no weapons of mass destruction in Iraq; this claim was controversial because the British and U.S. governments had been insisting at the time that such weapons did exist, and went to war in Iraq in part on the strength of the evidence of the existence of such weapons programs. Suskind's claim would suggest that the U.S. and UK may have known all along that there were no such weapons in Iraq. Suskind was interviewed on BBC Radio 4 on August 19, 2008. BBC security correspondent Gordon Corera followed the interview by reading a statement from former MI6 chief Sir Richard Dearlove, in which Dearlove said:

After reading the statement, Corera emphasized that the sources he spoke with "were careful not to deny that a meeting did take place with the Iraqi intelligence chief on the eve of war in which this man Habbush denied Saddam had any weapons. But I think the key question is whether he was meeting MI6 as a spy providing secret intelligence on Saddam, in which case his information might have been taken very seriously, or whether, in fact, this was a back channel that Saddam Hussein himself had authorized, and that therefore this Iraqi intelligence chief Habbush was simply saying what other Iraqi intelligence officials were already saying."

Book reviews
 
In his assessment for the Literary Review, Michael Burleigh noted the linked vignettes that formed the bedrock of the narrative: "Using a series of interwoven stories, some hopeful, others disturbing, Suskind explores whether the United States and the Muslim world will ever be able to find mutual respect and understanding ... This is a hugely important field that has never been so well examined." Similar encomium was used in analyzing Suskind's capabilities as a storyteller. The Sunday Times declared: "Suskind is never unsympathetic to his characters, who he appears to have debriefed intensively. He is a romantic, a writer who clearly believes that his country has betrayed its past, its values and its moral compass by failing to tell the truth about the war." Perhaps the most substantial testament to Suskind's return to a narrative style came from the New York Observer. "Moving ... Mr. Suskind is a prodigiously talented craftsman ... It’s all here: a cast of characters that sprawls across class and circumstance to represent the totality of a historical moment ... These hard times, Mr. Suskind’s book suggests, call for a nonfiction Dickens."

The New York Times
Reviewing the book for The New York Times, Mark Danner wrote:

Los Angeles Times
The Los Angeles Times's Tim Rutten was critical of The Way of the World, calling it "structurally a mess" and as "a work of literary nonfiction ... an irritating example of overreaching". Speaking of the book's conception, Rutten muses that "Suskind, mindful that the Bush/Cheney administration is staggering to inglorious conclusion, intended this book to look to the future as well as back to the recent past - to suggest, in some fashion, a way forward". Rutten credits Suskind, too, writing that "Suskind's reporting continues to make him an indispensable chronicler of the Bush/Cheney debacle"; and he weighs in to support Suskind on the controversy surrounding the Habbush letter, saying of the transcript posted on Suskind's website: "It not only supports Suskind's account as written, but shows he took a conservative approach toward his material."

Bloomberg
Reviewing the book for Bloomberg'', Timothy R. Homan writes:

See also
 Allegations of misappropriations related to the Iraq War

References

External links
 Official website
 Excerpt from The Way of the World, hosted with permission by MSNBC
 Plante, Bill (August 8, 2008). "Book Claims White House Forged War Intel". CBS News.

Current affairs books
2008 non-fiction books
Books about George W. Bush
Non-fiction books about the Central Intelligence Agency
War on Terror books
Iraq War books
Books about politics of the United States
George W. Bush administration controversies